FV may stand for:

Groups, organizations, companies
 Rossiya (airline), Russian airline (IATA code: FV)
 Fachbuchverlag Leipzig, a German publishing house
 Federal Vision, an evangelical Christian faith
 Funk Volume, a hip hop record label founded by American hip-hop artist Hopsin

Arts and entertainment
 Fantasy violence, a type of television parental rating
 FarmVille, a social networking game on Facebook

Transportation and vehicles
 Fishing vessel
 "Fighting Vehicle" in the British Army; see List of FV series military vehicles
 Fokker F.V, a 1922 Dutch aircraft
 Lockheed XFV, an experimental "tailsitter" aircraft

Technical, science and technology
 Future value, in finance
 Factor V, a protein of the coagulation system
 Fragment variable of an antibody, in biology

Other uses
 Taco Hemingway, a Polish rapper, formerly known as FV

See also

 
 VF (disambiguation)
 F5 (disambiguation)
 FU (disambiguation)
 FW (disambiguation)